In mathematics, a cubic surface is a surface in 3-dimensional space defined by one polynomial equation of degree 3. Cubic surfaces are fundamental examples in algebraic geometry. The theory is simplified by working in projective space rather than affine space, and so cubic surfaces are generally considered in projective 3-space . The theory also becomes more uniform by focusing on surfaces over the complex numbers rather than the real numbers; note that a complex surface has real dimension 4. A simple example is the Fermat cubic surface

Many properties of cubic surfaces hold more generally for del Pezzo surfaces.

Rationality of cubic surfaces
A central feature of smooth cubic surfaces X over an algebraically closed field is that they are all rational, as shown by Alfred Clebsch in 1866. That is, there is a one-to-one correspondence defined by rational functions between the projective plane  minus a lower-dimensional subset and X minus a lower-dimensional subset. More generally, every irreducible cubic surface (possibly singular) over an algebraically closed field is rational unless it is the projective cone over a cubic curve.

As a result, every smooth cubic surface over the complex numbers is diffeomorphic to the connected sum , where the minus sign refers to a change of orientation. As a complex manifold (or an algebraic variety), the surface depends on the arrangement of those 6 points.

27 lines on a cubic surface
Most proofs of rationality for cubic surfaces start by finding a line on the surface. More precisely, Arthur Cayley and George Salmon showed in 1849 that every smooth cubic surface over an algebraically closed field contains exactly 27 lines. This is a distinctive feature of cubics: a smooth quadric (degree 2) surface is covered by a continuous family of lines, while most surfaces of degree at least 4 in  contain no lines.

As the coefficients of a smooth complex cubic surface are varied, the 27 lines move continuously. As a result, a closed loop in the family of smooth cubic surfaces determines a permutation of the 27 lines. The group of permutations of the 27 lines arising this way is called the monodromy group of the family of cubic surfaces. A remarkable 19th-century discovery was that the monodromy group is neither trivial nor the whole symmetric group ; it is a group of order 51840, acting transitively on the set of lines. This group was gradually recognized (by Élie Cartan (1896), Arthur Coble (1915-17), and Patrick du Val (1936)) as the Weyl group of type , a group generated by reflections on a 6-dimensional real vector space, related to the Lie group  of dimension 78.

The same group of order 51840 can be described in combinatorial terms, as the automorphism group of the graph of the 27 lines, with a vertex for each line and an edge whenever two lines meet. This graph was analyzed in the 19th century using subgraphs such as the Schläfli double six configuration. The complementary graph (with an edge whenever two lines are disjoint) is known as the Schläfli graph.

Many problems about cubic surfaces can be solved using the combinatorics of the  root system. For example, the 27 lines can be identified with the weights of the fundamental representation of the Lie group . The possible sets of singularities that can occur on a cubic surface can be described in terms of subsystems of the  root system. One explanation for this connection is that the  lattice arises as the orthogonal complement to the anticanonical class  in the Picard group , with its intersection form (coming from the intersection theory of curves on a surface). For a smooth complex cubic surface, the Picard lattice can also be identified with the cohomology group .

An Eckardt point is a point where 3 of the 27 lines meet. Most cubic surfaces have no Eckardt point, but such points occur on a codimension-1 subset of the family of all smooth cubic surfaces.

The relation between cubic surfaces and the  root system generalizes to a relation between all del Pezzo surfaces and root systems. This is one of many ADE classifications in mathematics. Pursuing these analogies, Vera Serganova and Alexei Skorobogatov gave a direct geometric relation between cubic surfaces and the Lie group .

In physics, the 27 lines can be identified with the 27 possible charges of M-theory on a six-dimensional torus (6 momenta; 15 membranes; 6 fivebranes) and the group E6 then naturally acts as the U-duality group. This map between del Pezzo surfaces and M-theory on tori is known as mysterious duality.

Special cubic surfaces

Its automorphism group is an extension , of order 648.

The next most symmetric smooth cubic surface is the Clebsch surface, which

Its automorphism group is the symmetric group , of order 120. After a complex linear change of coordinates, the Clebsch surface can also be defined by the equation

Among singular complex cubic surfaces, Cayley's nodal cubic surface is the unique surface with the maximal number of nodes, 4:

Real cubic surfaces
In contrast to the complex case, the space of smooth cubic surfaces over the real numbers is not connected in the classical topology (based on the topology of R). Its connected components (in other words, the classification of smooth real cubic surfaces up to isotopy) were determined by Ludwig Schläfli (1863), Felix Klein (1865), and H. G. Zeuthen (1875). Correspondingly, the number of real lines contained in X is 27, 15, 7, 3, or 3.

A smooth real cubic surface is rational over R if and only if its space of real points is connected, hence in the first four of the previous five cases.

The average number of real lines on X is  when the defining polynomial for X is sampled at random from the Gaussian ensemble induced by the Bombieri inner product.

The moduli space of cubic surfaces
Geometric invariant theory gives a moduli space of cubic surfaces, with one point for each isomorphism class of smooth cubic surfaces. This moduli space has dimension 4. More precisely, it is an open subset of the weighted projective space P(12345), by Salmon and Clebsch (1860). In particular, it is a rational 4-fold.

The cone of curves
The lines on a cubic surface X over an algebraically closed field can be described intrinsically, without reference to the embedding of X in : they are exactly the (−1)-curves on X, meaning the curves isomorphic to  that have self-intersection −1.

For any projective variety X, the cone of curves means the convex cone spanned by all curves in X (in the real vector space  of 1-cycles modulo numerical equivalence, or in the homology group  if the base field is the complex numbers). For a cubic surface, the cone of curves is spanned by the 27 lines. There is a similar description of the cone of curves for any del Pezzo surface.

Cubic surfaces over a field
A smooth cubic surface X over a field k which is not algebraically closed need not be rational over k. As an extreme case, there are smooth cubic surfaces over the rational numbers Q (or the p-adic numbers ) with no rational points, in which case X is certainly not rational. If X(k) is nonempty, then X is at least unirational over k, by Beniamino Segre and János Kollár. For k infinite, unirationality implies that the set of k-rational points is Zariski dense in X.

The absolute Galois group of k permutes the 27 lines of X over the algebraic closure  of k (through some subgroup of the Weyl group of ). If some orbit of this action consists of disjoint lines, then X is the blow-up of a "simpler" del Pezzo surface over k at a closed point. Otherwise, X has Picard number 1. (The Picard group of X is a subgroup of the geometric Picard group .) In the latter case, Segre showed that X is never rational. More strongly, Yuri Manin proved a birational rigidity statement: two smooth cubic surfaces with Picard number 1 over a perfect field k are birational if and only if they are isomorphic. For example, these results give many cubic surfaces over Q that are unirational but not rational.

Singular cubic surfaces 
In contrast to smooth cubic surfaces which contain 27 lines, singular cubic surfaces contain fewer lines.   Moreover, they can be classified by the type of singularity which arises in their normal form. These singularities are classified using Dynkin diagrams.

Classification 
Depending on the type of singularity   contains, it is isomorphic to the projective surface in  given by  where  are as in the table below. That means we can obtain a classification of all singular cubic surfaces. Notice that there are two different singular cubic surfaces with singularity . 

Lines on singular cubic surfaces 
According to the classification of singular cubic surfaces, the following table shows the number of lines each surface contains.

Automorphism groups of singular cubic surfaces with no parameters 
Such automorphisms preserve singular points. Moreover, they do not permute singularities of different types. If the surface contains two singularities of the same type, the automorphism may permute them. The collection of automorphisms on a cubic surface forms a group, the so-called automorphism group. The following table shows all automorphism groups of singular cubic surfaces with no parameters.

See also
Algebraic surface
Enriques–Kodaira classification
Fano variety
Schubert calculus

Notes

References

External links

 
 Lines on a Cubic Surface by Ryan Hoban (The Experimental Geometry Lab at the University of Maryland), based on work by William Goldman, The Wolfram Demonstrations Project.
 The Cubic Surfaces DVD (54 animations of cubic surfaces, downloadable separately or as a DVD)

Algebraic surfaces
Complex surfaces